Preston High School is a four-year public secondary school in Preston, Idaho, the only traditional high school in the Preston School District #201.  The school colors are blue, white, and gold and the mascot is a Native American.

PHS was one of the primary filming locations for the 2004 hit movie Napoleon Dynamite, where movie director Jared Hess graduated in 1997.

Athletics
Preston competes in athletics in IHSAA Class 4A in the Great Basin (East) Conference with Pocatello and Century of Pocatello. Longtime in Class A-2 and its successor 3A, Preston moved up to 4A in 2004.

State titles
Boys
 Football (1): fall (A-2, now 3A) 1993 (official with introduction of A-2 playoffs, fall 1978)
(unofficial poll titles - 0)  (poll introduced in 1963, through 1977)
 Cross Country (4): fall (A-2, now 3A) 1994, 2000; (3A) 2001, 2002  (introduced in 1964)
 Basketball (9): (A, now 5A) 1946; (A-2, now 3A) 1968, 1989, 1990; (3A) 2001, 2003  (4A) 2016, 2017, 2018, 2020
 Wrestling (1): (A-2, now 3A) 1979  (introduced in 1958)
Girls
 Cross Country (4): fall (A-2, now 3A) 1994, 2000; (3A) 2001; (4A) 2008  (introduced in 1974)
 Soccer (1): fall (4A) 2015  (introduced in 2000)
 Volleyball (5): fall (A-2, now 3A) 1981, 1983, 1994, 1995; (3A) 2002  (introduced in 1976)
 Basketball (1): (A-2, now 3A) 1986  (introduced in 1976)

References

External links
 
 Preston School District

Public high schools in Idaho
Schools in Franklin County, Idaho